Ramblewood may refer to a location in the United States:

 Ramblewood, New Jersey, a census-designated place
 Ramblewood, Pennsylvania, a census-designated place
 Ramblewood, Baltimore, Maryland, a neighborhood in north Baltimore